Hanne Marie Skram (née Thorstensen, November 14, 1937 – January 11, 2017) was a Norwegian dancer.

Skram trained at Alfhild Grimsgaard's ballet school and in Paris, London, and New York. She became a dancer at the Norwegian National Opera and Ballet in 1959. She became the principal dancer in 1968 and had a number of solo roles. For 18 years she led the Hanne Skram Ballet School. She was married to Knut Skram, with whom she had two children: the lawyer Kristin Skram Brændvang and the composer Henrik Skram.

Solo dance performances
 Brian Macdonald's Pointe Counterpointe (retitled Aimez-vous Bach?)
 Birgit Cullberg's Miss Julie as Julie
 Frédéric Chopin's Les Sylphides
 Pyotr Ilyich Tchaikovsky's Swan Lake as Odette
 Pyotr Ilyich Tchaikovsky's The Nutcracker
 Sergei Prokofiev's Romeo and Juliet as Juliet
 Sergei Prokofiev's Cinderella as Cinderella

Filmography
 Millionær for en aften as a dancer

References

External links
 
 Hanne Skram at Sceneweb
 Hanne Skram at Filmfront

1937 births
2017 deaths
20th-century Norwegian actresses
Norwegian female dancers
People from Bærum